Yurre in Spanish or Ihurre in Basque is a village in Vitoria-Gasteiz, Álava, Basque Country, Spain.

Populated places in Álava